Don't Lose Your Cool is the eighth studio album by Albert Collins, released in 1983 by Alligator Records.

Track listing
"Get to Gettin'" (Big Walter Price) – 3:12
"My Mind Is Trying to Leave Me" (Percy Mayfield) – 7:42
"Broke" (Chuck Higgins) – 4:12
"Don't Lose Your Cool" (Collins) – 4:39
"When a Guitar Plays the Blues" (Harvard Hables, Roy Lee Johnson) – 5:12
"But I Was Cool" (Oscar Brown, Jr.) – 3:09
"Meltdown" (Collins) – 4:03
"Ego Trip" (Collins) – 4:32
"Quicksand" (Guitar Slim) – 3:28

Personnel
Albert Collins - guitar, vocals
The Ice Breakers
Johnny Gayden - bass
Casey Jones - drums, vocals
Larry Burton - guitar
Chris Foreman - keyboards
A.C. Reed - tenor saxophone
Abb Locke, Dino Spells - alto and tenor saxophone
Technical
Fred Breitberg - engineer, mixing
Michael Weinstein - photography

References

External links
 Alligator Records - Don't Lose Your Cool

1983 albums
Albert Collins albums
Alligator Records albums
Albums produced by Bruce Iglauer